William Benton Boggs (October 8, 1854 – February 18, 1922) was an American politician. He served as a Democratic member of the Louisiana House of Representatives and the Louisiana State Senate.

Boggs was born in Alabama, the son of Lucinda Barnett and Samuel Boggs. Boggs served as the mayor of Plain Dealing, Louisiana. In 1892, he was elected to the Louisiana House of Representatives. Boggs succeeded Robert Houston Curry. In 1900, he was succeeded by W. H. McClenaghen. Eight years later, Boggs was elected to the Louisiana State Senate. He succeeded E. S. Dortch. In 1916, Boggs was succeeded by William J. Johnston.

Boggs died in February 1922 in Alabama, at the age of 67. He was buried in Plain Dealing Cemetery.

References 

1854 births
1922 deaths
People from Calhoun County, Alabama
People from Plain Dealing, Louisiana
Mayors of places in Louisiana
Democratic Party Louisiana state senators
Democratic Party members of the Louisiana House of Representatives
19th-century American politicians
20th-century American politicians
Burials in Louisiana